Bathsheba Grossman (born 1966) is an American artist who creates sculptures using computer-aided design and three-dimensional modeling, with metal printing technology to produce sculpture in bronze and stainless steel. Her bronze sculptures are primarily mathematical in nature, often depicting intricate patterns or mathematical oddities (for instance, a figure with only one side but three edges).  Her website also has crystals that have been laser etched with three-dimensional patterns, including models of nearby stars, the DNA macromolecule, and the Milky Way Galaxy.

Grossman's works have featured in art galleries around the world, as well as The New York Times, and the television series Numb3rs and Heroes. In July 2012, her work The Rygo was installed in the VanDusen Botanical Garden in Vancouver; at 2 meters high, as of the time of installation it is the largest 3D print in North America.

She studied under sculptor Erwin Hauer at Yale University as a mathematics undergraduate, and later with Robert Engman at the University of Pennsylvania.

Her brothers are the writers Austin Grossman and Lev Grossman.  She is the daughter of the poet Allen Grossman and the novelist Judith Grossman. Grossman's father was born Jewish and her mother was raised Anglican.

References

External links
 Bathsheba.com
 Profile and gallery in symmetry magazine

1966 births
Living people
Jewish American artists
Jewish sculptors
Jewish women sculptors
20th-century American sculptors
21st-century American sculptors
People from Santa Cruz, California
Yale University alumni
University of Pennsylvania School of Design alumni
Place of birth missing (living people)
Mathematical artists
20th-century American women artists
21st-century American women artists
American women sculptors
21st-century American Jews